The following is an alphabetical list of the islands and cays of the Commonwealth of The Bahamas.

A 
Abaco Island
Abner Cay
Abraham's Bay
Acklins Island
Adderley Cay
Alcorine Cay
Alder Cay
Allan Cays
Allans Cay
Ambergris Cay(s)
Andrew island
Andros Island - largest island of the Bahamas
Angel Cays
Angle and Fish Cay
Anna Cay
Arawak Cay
Araway Cay
Archers Cay
Athol Island
Atwood Cay
August Cay

B 
Back Cay
Bahama Cay
Bahama Island
Bamboo Cay
Barraterre Island
Barn Cay
Barracuda Island
Base Line Cay
Beach Cay
Beacon Cay
Beak Cay
Bell Cay (owned by the Aga Khan IV)
Ben Cay
Berry Islands
Big Bersus Cay
Big Carters Cay
Big Cave Cay
Big Cay
Big Crab Cay
Big Cross Cay
Big Darby Island, a private island in the Exumas
Big Egg Island
Big Farmer's Cay
Big Fish Cay
Big Grand Cay
Big Harbour Cay
Big Hog Cay
Big Jerry Cay
Big Joe Downer Cay
Big Lake Cay
Big Lloyd Cay
Big Major Cay
Big Pigeon Cay
Big Romers Cay
Big Thrift Harbour Cay
Big Whale Cay
Big Wood Cay
Billy Cay
Bimini Islands
Bird Cay
Bitter Guana Cay
Black Island
Bock Cat Cay
Bob Cay
Bock Cay
Bonds Cay
Bonefish Cay
Booby Cay
Bowe Cay
Bridges Cay
Brigantine Cays
Brown Cay
Brush Cay
Buena Vista Cay
Burnside Cay
Burroughs Cay
Burrow Cay
Bursis Cay
Buttonwood Cay

C 
Cabbage Cay
Caeser Cay
Calabash Cay
Cambridge Cay
Candle Cays
Carter Cay
Cashs Cay
Castaway Cay - private island and an exclusive port for Disney Cruise Line
Castle Island
Cat Island
Cat Cay
Catch Island
Catto Cay
Cave Cay, a private island in the Exumas
Cay Lobos (closest point of The Bahamas to Cuba (Cayo Confites): 22 km (13.6 mi))
Cay One
Cay Sal Bank
Cay Santo Domingo
Cay With Low Fall
Caye a Rum
Caye de Sel
Channel Cay(s)
Children's Bay Cay
Chub Cay
Cistern Cay
Clem Cay
Cluffs Cay
Coakley Cay
Cockroach Cay
Cocoa Cay
Cocoa Plum Cay
Comfort Cay
Compass Cay
Cold Cay
Conception Island
Conchshell Cay
Cook's Cay
Cormorant Cay
Cornish Cay
Cotton Bay Cay
Cotton Cay
Crab Cay
Crisby Island
Crooked Island
Cross Cay(s)
Culmer's Cay
Cupid's Cay
Curly Cut Cays
Current Island

E 
East Cay
Egg Island
Elbow Cay
Elbow Cays (Cay Sal Bank)
Eleuthera Island
Elizabeth Island
Exuma Island

F 
Factory Cays
Falcon Cays
Fanny Cay
Fernandez Cay
Fiddle Cay
Fifteen Feet Cay
Finley Cay
Fish Cay(s)
Fish Hawk Cay
Fishing Cays
Flamingo Cay
Flat Cays
Foots Cay
Fortune Island
Fowl Cay
Fraizer's Hog Cay
French Cay(s)
Frog Cay
Frozen Cay

G 
Galliot Cay
Garden Cay
Gaulding Cay
Gaulin Cay
Geouge Island
Gibson Cay
Gibson Hog Cay
Ginger Cay
Glass Cay
Goat Cay, Berry Islands
Goat Cay, Exuma
Gold Cay
Gold Ring Cay
Goole Cay
Gorda Cay (Castaway Cay)
Goulding Cay
Grand Bahama
Grand Cay(s)
Great Cistern Cay
Great Exuma Island
Great Guana Cay
Great Guano Cay
Great Harbour Cay
Great Inagua Island
Great Isaac Cay
Great Ragged Island
Great Sale Cay
Great Seal Cay
Great Stirrup Cay - a private island of Norwegian Cruise Line
Green Cay
Green Turtle Cay
Griffins Cay
Grunt Cay
Guanahani Cay
Guana Cay
Guincho Ginger Cay
Guinchos Cay (18 miles (29 km) from Cuba)
Gun Cay
Gut Island

H 
Haines Cay
Halls Pond Cay, a private island in the Exumas, also known as Spectabilis Island
Halls Islands
Harbour Island
Harvey Cay
Harvey Cays
Hawksbill Cays
Hawksnest Cay
Heneagua Island
High Cay
High Point Cay
High Ridge Cay
Highbourne Cay
Hoffman Cay
Hog Cay, Long Island
Hog Cay, Ragged Island
Holmes Cay

I 
Inagua Island
India Cay
Iron Cay
Ishmael Cay

J 
Jamaica Cay
James Cay
Jewfish Cay
Joe Cays
Joe Creek Island
Joe Downer Cays
John Downer Cays
Johnny's Cay
Johnsons Cay
Josephs Cay
Joulter Cays
Jumento Cays

K 
Kamalame Cay
Kemp Cay
Kits Cay
Knife Cay

L 
Lanzadera Cay
Laughing Bird Cay
Lee Stocking Island
Leonard Cay
Levi Island
Lightbourn's Cay
Lighthouse Point
Lignumvitae Cay
Linder Cay
Little Abaco Island
Little Bell Cay
Little Bersus Cay
Little Carters Island
Little Cat Island
Little Cave Cay
Little Cay
Little Cistern Cay
Little Crab Cay
Little Darby Island
Little Exuma Island
Little Farmer's Cay
Little Grand Cay
Little Guana Cay
Little Cuana Cay
Little Harbour Cay
Little Inagua Island
Little Island
Little Joe Downer Cay
Little Lloyd Cay
Little Major's Island
Little Nurse Cay
Little Petit Cay
Little Pimlico Cay
Little Pipe Cay, a private island in the Exumas
Little Ragged Island
Little Romers Cay
Little Sale Cay
Little San Salvador (Half Moon Cay) - a private island, owned by Carnival Corporation
Little Stirrup Cay - renamed Coco Cay, a private island, leased by Royal Caribbean Cruises Ltd.
Little Walker Cay
Little Wax Cay
Little Whale Cay
Lizard Cay
Lobster Cay
Lockhart Cay
Loggerhead Cay
Lone Pine Cay
Long Cay
Long Island
Lovely Bay Cays
Low Cay
Low Water Harbour Cay
Lower Crisby Cay
Lubbers Quarters Cay
Lucian Cay
Lyford Cay
Lynyard Cay

M 
Madam Dau's Cay
Madeira Cay
Major's Island
Mamma Rhonda Cay
Man Head Cay
Man Island
Man-O-War Cay(s)
Mangrove Cay
Mangrove Island
Manjack Cay
Margaret Cay
Mariguana Island
Marine Cay
Market Fish Cays
Mary Cays
Mastic Cay
Mat Lowe's Cay
Mayaguana
Maycock Cay
Meeks Patch Island
Melita Cay
Michael's Cay
Middle Cay
Middle Bight Cay
Mira Por Vos Islands
Molley Sanders Island
Money Cay
Moore's Island
Moosha Cay
Moraine Cay
Moriah Harbour Cay
Mouth Of Harbou Cay
Muertos Cays
Musha Cay

N 
Nairn Cay
New Cay
New Providence
Newton Cay
Noah Bethel Cays
Noname Cay
Norman's Cay - has served as the headquarters for Carlos Lehder's drug-smuggling operation from 1978 to around 1982
Norman's Pond Cay
North Andros
North Bimini
North Cat Cay
North Cay
North Elbow Cay
North Halls Cay
Northern Eleuthera
Northwest Cay
Noss Mangrove Island
Nun Jack Cay
Nurse Cay
Nurse Channel Cay
Nassau

O 
O'Brien Cay
Ocean Cay
Old Yankee Cay
Orange Cay
Outer Point Cay
Over Yonder Cay
Oyster Cay

P 
Paradise Island
Parrot Cays
Paw Paw Cay
Peace and Plenty Island
Pear Cay
Pelican Cays
Pensacola Cays
Perpall's Cay
Petit Cay
Piana Cays
Pierre Island
Pigeon Cays
Pimlico Cays
Pimlico Island(s)
Pine Cay
Pine Tree Cay
Pineapple Cays
Pipe Cay
Plana Cay
Plum Cays
Pot Cay
Potter Cay
Powell Cay
Prime Cay
Pumpion Cay

R 
Racoon Cay
Ragged Island
Rainbow Cay
Randall's Cay
Rat Cay
Ratman Cay
Ratmans Cay
Red Shank Cay
Reid Cay
Rock Harbour Cays
Roker Cay
Rose Island
Royal Island
Rudder Cut Cay, a private island with an airstrip in the Exumas, owned by illusionist David Copperfield
Rum Cay
Russell Island

S 
Saddle Back Cay
Saddle Cay
Sailor's Choice Cay
Sales Cay
Salt Cay, Bahamas
Salt Pond Cay
Samama Cays
Samana Cay
Samphire Cay
Samphire Cays
Sampson Cay - private island owned by John C. Malone.
San Salvador
Sand Bank Cays
Sanders Island
Sandy Cay
Sandy Harbour Cay
Sapodilla Cay
Schooner Cays
Scotland Cay
Scrub Cays
Seal Cay
Sheep Cay
Ship Channel Cay
Shroud Cays
Silver Cay
Simms Cay
Sister Cays
Six Shilling Cays
Smith Cay
Snake Cay
Snapper Cay
Soldier Cays
South Bimini
South Cat Cay
South Cay
South Channel Cay
South Spot Cay
South Mangrove Cays
South Stirrup Cay
Southeast Cay
Southern Cay
Spanish Cay
Spanish Wells Cay
St. George's Caye
Staniard Cay
Staniel Cay
Steamer Cay
Stocking Island
Strachan Cay
Stranger Cay
Sugar Loaf Cay
Sun Cay
Sweetings Cay

T 
Tarzan Cay
Tear Coat Cay
Tee Cay
Thatch Cays
Thomas Cay
Thompson Cay
Tilloo Cay
Top Cay
Torch Cay, Exuma
Tumar Cay
Turner Cay
Twin Cays

U 
Upper Cay
Upper Channel Cay
Upper Samphier Cay
Upper Sandy Harbour Cay

V 
Verd Key
Victory Cays
Vigilant Cay

W 
Warderick Wells Cay
Walker's Cay
Water Cay(s)
Watling Island
Wax Cay
Weatherford Cay
Well Cay
West Cay
West Shroud Cay
Wet Cay
Whale Cay
White Bay Cay
White Cay
William Cay
William Island
Willis Cay
Wilson Cay
Wiltshires Cay
Windermere Island
Wood Cay
Woolen Dean Cay

Y 
Yellow Cay
Young Cay
Yuma Island

See also

The Bahamas
List of islands of the Bahamas by total area
Geography of the Bahamas
Districts of the Bahamas
List of cities in the Bahamas
List of Bahamas-related topics
Lucayan Archipelago
List of islands by area
List of islands by highest point
List of islands by population
List of islands in lakes

References

External links

 
 Islands of the Bahamas @ United Nations Environment Programme

 
Islands
Bahamas